Trey Alexander is an American college basketball player for Creighton Bluejays of the Big East Conference.

Early life and high school
Alexander grew up in Oklahoma City, Oklahoma and attended Heritage Hall School. He was named the Oklahoma Gatorade Player of the Year after averaging 23.6 points, 8.7 rebounds, 4.0 assists, and 2.1 steals per game as a senior.

Alexander was rated a four-star recruit. He committed to play college basketball at Auburn over offers from Arkansas, Georgia, Oklahoma, Ole Miss, and Kansas. Alexander decommitted from the program at the end of his senior season. He later signed to play at Creighton.

College career
Alexander played in all 35 of Creighton's games during his freshman season and was named to the Big East Conference All-Freshman team after averaging 7.4 points, 3.7 rebounds, and 2.5 assists per game. He became the Bluejays' starting point guard after Ryan Nembhard suffered a season-ending injury. Alexander averaged 11.6 points, 4.3 assists, and 4.0 assists during the final eight games of the season.

Alexander entered his sophomore season as Creighton's starting shooting guard.

References

External links
Creighton Bluejays bio

Living people
American men's basketball players
Basketball players from Oklahoma
Creighton Bluejays men's basketball players
Year of birth missing (living people)